is a Japanese actor, voice actor and narrator. He is the founder of Hirata Production.

He is best known for voicing Vinsmoke Sanji in One Piece. His other known roles include Sha Gojyo in Saiyuki, Kotetsu T. Kaburagi in Tiger & Bunny, Klein in Sword Art Online, Vergil in the Devil May Cry series, Mutta Nanba in Space Brothers, Leomon in Digimon Adventure, George Kodama in Kaze no Yojimbo and Mr. Kondo in  After the Rain. He is also the official Japanese dub-over artist for Johnny Depp, Matt Damon, Noah Wyle and Matt LeBlanc. In addition, he dubbed many roles of Jude Law, Ewan McGregor, and Josh Hartnett.

Career
After graduating from Toshima High School, Hirata attended the Subaru Theater School and then joined Theatre Company Subaru. His first stage performance was in A Midsummer Night's Dream in 1986. While he was working as a stage actor, his manager at the time asked him if he was interested in becoming a voice actor, and he auditioned. Since then, he has dubbed for many Western movies and has worked in animation.

In 2011, he played the main character Kotetsu T. Kaburagi in the anime Tiger & Bunny and won the 11th Tokyo Anime Award for Best Voice Actor and the 6th Seiyu Awards for Best Actor in leading role. In the same year, he left Theater Company Subaru, where he had worked for 27 years, and started a new company, Hirata Production Japan.

On January 9, 2017, Hirata was chosen 25th in the 3-hour voice actor general election special that broadcast on TV Asahi, where 200 popular voice actors were ranked.

Filmography

Television animation

Original video animation (OVA) 

2001 - Zaion: I Wish You Were Here (Changpuek)
2006 - Hellsing Ultimate OVA (Pip Bernadotte)
2007 - Strait Jacket (????) (Falk)
2007 - Saiyuki Reload: Burial, Sha Gojyo
2011 - Saiyuki Gaiden, General Kenren  
2013 - Saiyuki Gaiden: Kouga no Shou, General Kenren

Film animation 
 Digimon Adventure (2000) (TV announcer, Adult Takeru "T.K." Takaishi)
 One Piece series (2001–) (Vinsmoke Sanji)
 Saiyuki: Requiem (2001) (Sha Gojyo)
 WXIII: Patlabor the Movie 3 (2002) (Shinichiro Hata)
 Ghost in the Shell 2: Innocence (2004) (Koga)
 Asura (2012) (Shichiro)
 Tiger & Bunny: The Beginning (2012) (Kotetsu T. Kaburagi / Wild Tiger)
 Tiger & Bunny: The Rising (2013) (Kotetsu T. Kaburagi / Wild Tiger)
 New Initial D: Legend 1 - Awakening (2014) (Bunta Fujiwara)
 Saint Seiya: Legend of Sanctuary (2014) (Cancer Deathmask)
 Crayon Shin-Chan: My Moving Story! Cactus Large Attack! (2015) (Mayor of Mexico)
 Digimon Adventure tri. (2015) (Narrator, Leomon, Gennai)
 Sword Art Online The Movie: Ordinal Scale (2017) (Klein / Ryōtarō Tsuboi)
 Maquia: When the Promised Flower Blooms (2018) (Baro)
 Pretty Cure Miracle Leap: A Strange Day with Everyone (2020) (Refrain)
Burn the Witch (2020) (Billy Banx Jr.)
Crayon Shin-chan: Crash! Rakuga Kingdom and Almost Four Heroes (2020) (Court painter)
Kono Sekai no Tanoshimikata: Secret Story Film (2020) (Tamagoro Someya)

Tokusatsu 
2011
 Kaizoku Sentai Gokaiger (2011-2012) (Engine Machalcon (eps. 35 - 39, 41 - 44, 46 - 47, 49 - 50))
2012
 Unofficial Sentai Akibaranger (Delu Knight (eps. 10 - 12), Senmotorishimayaku Delu Knight (ep. 10))
 Kamen Rider Wizard (Narration)
2013
 Unofficial Sentai Akibaranger: Season Tsuu (Delu Knight (eps. 10 - 11))

Video games 
 Ace Combat 5: The Unsung War (Albert Genette)
 Namco × Capcom (Bruce McGivern, Kamuz)
 Kingdom Hearts II (Captain Jack Sparrow)
 Final Fantasy XII (Balthier)
 Sonic and the Black Knight (Caliburn/Excalibur)
 God Eater (Lindow Amamiya)
 The 3rd Birthday (Kunihiko Maeda)
 Dissidia 012 Final Fantasy (Laguna Loire)
 Ultimate Marvel vs. Capcom 3 (Vergil)
 Project X Zone (Lindow Amamiya)
 God Eater 2 (Lindow Amamiya)
 Sword Art Online: Infinity Moment (2013)as klein
 Granblue Fantasy (2014) (Rackam)
 Sword Art Online: Hollow Fragment as klein
 Devil May Cry 4: Special Edition (Vergil)
 Project X Zone 2 (Vergil)
 World of Final Fantasy (Balthier)
 Dissidia Final Fantasy Opera Omnia (Laguna Loire, Balthier)
 God Eater Resonant Ops (Lindow Amamiya)
 Kingdom Hearts III (Captain Jack Sparrow)
 Devil May Cry 5 (Vergil)
 Tokyo Afterschool Summoners (2019) (Tsukuyomi)
 Return to Shironagasu Island (2022) (Norman North)
 Sword Art Online: Last Recollection (2023) (Klein)

Unknown date
 Catherine (Orlando Haddick)
 Chaos Rings Omega (Veig/Olgar)
 Granado Espada (Raven)
 Heavy Rain (Norman Jayden)
 Jeanne d'Arc (video game) (Gilles de Rais)
 JoJo's Bizarre Adventure: All-Star Battle (Jean Pierre Polnareff)
 Metal Gear Rising: Revengeance (Samuel Rodrigues)
 Naruto series (Genma Shiranui)
 Ninja Gaiden 3 (Cliff Higgins)
 One Piece series (Vinsmoke Sanji)
 Spyro x Sparx: Tondemo Tours (Hunter the Cheetah (Gregg Berger))
 Tales of Innocence (Ricardo Soldato, Hypnos)
 Time Travelers (Kyugo Shindo)
 Xenosaga series (Allen Ridgeley).
 Live a Hero (Vulpecula)

Television drama 
 Daddy Sister (2016)
 The 13 Lords of the Shogun (2022), Satake Yoshimasa
 The Old Dog, New Tricks? (2022), Minato
 Ishiko and Haneo: You're Suing Me? (2022), Riichiro Hyuga

Dubbing roles

Live action

Animation

References

External links
  
 
 seiyuu.info Hiroaki Hirata at the Seiyuu database
 
 
 

1963 births
Living people
Best Actor Seiyu Award winners
Japanese male musical theatre actors
Japanese male video game actors
Japanese male voice actors
Male voice actors from Tokyo
Seiyu Award winners
20th-century Japanese male actors
21st-century Japanese male actors